Frøken Schultz's Skole ('Miss Schultz' School') was a girls' school in Bergen in Norway between 1817 and 1913. It was a pioneer institution as the first school for girls in the city of Bergen, which was the biggest city in Norway at the time. While several schools for girls followed, it continued to be one of the most important schools for girls in Bergen during its existence.

History
The school was founded by Agathe Schultz, also spelled Scholtz and Scholz. At the time of its foundation, girls in Bergen could only be schooled in the first grades in the clerical grammar schools, in the pauper schools, or by private teachers at home. As Bergen was the biggest city in Norway, the school managed to flourish and continued to do so even when successful rival schools were founded from the 1840s onward.

The school was initially typical of girl's pensions at the time, giving lessons in German, French, and female accomplishments. Like other schools of that kind, it gradually evolved along with new demands on education for women. In 1885, it formally transformed into a serious five-level secondary educational school.

After Agathe Scholtz, the school was managed by "the Misses Irgens", by 'Mrs Reusch' in 1850–1875, by R. Hille in 1875–1885 and by Sofie Irgens Grieg from 1885, and as was common, was called by the name of their current manager.

References 

Educational institutions established in 1817
Educational institutions disestablished in 1913
Girls' schools in Europe
Schools in Norway
1817 establishments in Norway
1913 disestablishments in Norway
Defunct schools in Norway
19th century in Bergen
Defunct girls' schools